Vavřinec is a municipality and village in Kutná Hora District in the Central Bohemian Region of the Czech Republic. It has about 600 inhabitants.

Administrative parts
Villages of Chmeliště and Žíšov are administrative parts of Vavřinec.

History
The settlement was founded together with the local church in the 14th century and was named after the patron of the original Romanesque church – Saint Lawrence.

References

Villages in Kutná Hora District